Canchiscocha (possibly from Quechua qanchis seven qucha lake, "seven lakes") is a lake in the Cordillera Negra in the Andes of Peru located in the Ancash Region, Yungay Province, Quillo District. It lies northeast of Puka Ranra.

References 

Lakes of Peru
Lakes of Ancash Region